Cahuish (possibly from Quechua qawi put into the sun) is a mountain in the Cordillera Blanca in the Andes of Peru, about  high. It is situated in the Ancash Region, Huari Province, Chavin de Huantar District, and in the Recuay Province, Ticapampa District. Cahuish lies southwest of the mountain and the archaeological site of Waraqayuq and southeast of Yanamarey.

References 

Mountains of Peru
Mountains of Ancash Region